Okul may refer to:

 Okul (film), a 2004 Turkish horror-comedy film
 John Okul, Papua New Guinean rugby league player
 Pi Capricorni, a star in the constellation Capricorn